Mount Richardson Provincial Park is a provincial park in British Columbia, Canada, located on the lower Sunshine Coast to the north of Sechelt.

References 
 BC Parks webpage

External links 
 
 Seal Cove - historic wilderness site at the base of Mount Richardson

Provincial parks of British Columbia
Sunshine Coast Regional District
Sunshine Coast (British Columbia)
1999 establishments in British Columbia
Protected areas established in 1999